Shahrbanoo Sadat (born in 1991) is an Afghan filmmaker born in Tehran, Iran.

Life and career
Sadat grew up in Tehran and a remote community in central Afghanistan.  She studied documentary filmmaking at the Kabul workshop of Ateliers Varan , and began her career working in cinema vérité.  Her first feature film, Wolf and Sheep, tells the story of a village much like the one where she grew up.  It won the top prize at the Cannes Film Festival's Directors' Fortnight in 2016.

Filmography
A smile for life, a short documentary (2009)
Vice Versa One, a short fiction film (2011)
 Not at Home, a hybrid film (2013)
Who wants to be the wolf?, a short fiction film (2014)
Wolf and Sheep, a feature film (2016)
The Orphanage, a feature film (2019)
QURUT, Recipe of a possible extinct food, a short fiction film - a part of a climate change anthology (2019)

References

External links
 

1990 births
People from Tehran
Afghan film directors
Afghan women film directors
Living people
Afghan expatriates in Iran